Adel Sabeel (Arabic :عادل سبيل) (born 1 February 1998) is an Emirati footballer. He currently plays for Khor Fakkan .

References

External links
 

Emirati footballers
1998 births
Living people
Al Shabab Al Arabi Club Dubai players
Shabab Al-Ahli Club players
Al Wahda FC players
Dibba FC players
Khor Fakkan Sports Club players
Place of birth missing (living people)
UAE Pro League players
Association football fullbacks